Lin Qi may refer to:

 Lin Qi (林奇; 1981-2020), former CEO of Yoozoo Games
 Lin Qi (林启; 1839-1900), Imperial Chinese politician, founder of Yangzheng College (now known as Hangzhou High School or Hangzhou No. 4 High School) and Qiushi Academy (now known as Zhejiang University)